Bhadkal Gate is a structure in Aurangabad City in Maharashtra, India. This gate is the biggest in the city. It was built by Ahamadnagar's Murtaza Nizamshah's vizier Malik Ambar to commemorate the victory against the Mughals in 1612. It is also known as Victory Gate. 

The monument is listed under State Protected Monuments of Maharashtra as compiled by Archaeological Survey of India.

References

External links

Gates in India
Tourist attractions in Aurangabad, Maharashtra
Buildings and structures in Aurangabad, Maharashtra
1612 establishments in India